Bald Mountain (New York) may refer to:
Bald Mountain (Herkimer County, New York)

Bald Mountain (Lewis County, New York)
Bald Mountain Brook